James Lawrence Buffington (born May 15, 1922, Jersey Shore, Pennsylvania; died July 20, 1981, Englewood, New Jersey) was an American jazz, studio, and classical  hornist. 

Buffington was a busy studio and jazz player on the French horn. He was an autodidact as a child, though his father played piano and trumpet. He graduated from the Eastman School of Music and began playing in New York City in the 1950s, with Oscar Pettiford among others. He played with Mel Powell in 1954 and Teddy Charles in 1956.

He is perhaps best known for his work with Miles Davis on some of his Gil Evans sessions for Columbia Records. He has done extensive work as a session musician, and has recorded with Moondog, Carly Simon, James Brown, Urbie Green, Jimmy Cleveland, Ernie Royal, Britt Woodman, Don Butterfield, Donald Byrd, John Coltrane, Dizzy Gillespie, J. J. Johnson, Quincy Jones, Thad Jones and Mel Lewis, Michel Legrand, Lee Morgan, Paul Desmond, Eddie Sauter,  Oliver Nelson, Wes Montgomery, Jimmy Smith, the Modern Jazz Quartet and Grover Washington, Jr. Late in the 1970s he played with Freddie Hubbard, Gato Barbieri and George Benson; in 1980 he played on a Helen Merrill album.

Buffington released some solo work but it is far less well known.

Discography
With Manny Albam
The Drum Suite (RCA Victor, 1956) with Ernie Wilkins
Brass on Fire (Sold State, 1966)
With Gato Barbieri
Chapter Three: Viva Emiliano Zapata (Impulse!, 1974)
With Donald Byrd
I'm Tryin' to Get Home (Blue Note, 1965)
With Teddy Charles
Word from Bird (Atlantic, 1957)
With Al Cohn
Son of Drum Suite (RCA Victor, 1960)
With John Coltrane
The Complete Africa/Brass Session (Impulse! Records, 1961)
With Hank Crawford
Wildflower (Kudu, 1973)
With Miles Davis
Miles Ahead (Columbia, 1957)
Sketches Of Spain  (Columbia, 1959–60)
With Paul Desmond
Summertime (A&M/CTI, 1968)
From the Hot Afternoon (A&M/CTI, 1969)
With Bill Evans
Symbiosis (MPS, 1974)
With Gil Evans
The Individualism of Gil Evans (Verve, 1963–64)
With Art Farmer
The Aztec Suite (United Artists, 1959)
Listen to Art Farmer and the Orchestra (Mercury, 1962)
With Maynard Ferguson
The Blues Roar (Mainstream, 1965)
With Curtis Fuller
Cabin in the Sky (Impulse!, 1962)
With Stan Getz
Mickey One (Verve, 1965)
What the World Needs Now: Stan Getz Plays Burt Bacharach and Hal David (Verve, 1968)
With Dizzy Gillespie
Dizzy and Strings (Norgran, 1954)
Gillespiana (Verve, 1960)
Carnegie Hall Concert (Verve, 1961)
Perceptions (Verve, 1961) 
With Coleman Hawkins
The Hawk in Hi Fi (RCA Victor, 1956)
With Jimmy Heath
Swamp Seed (Riverside, 1963)
With Jackie and Roy
Time & Love (CTI, 1972)
With J. J. Johnson
J.J.! (RCA Victor, 1964)
Broadway Express (RCA Victor, 1965)
With Quincy Jones
Quincy Jones Explores the Music of Henry Mancini (Mercury, 1964)
 Golden Boy (Mercury, 1964)
Quincy Plays for Pussycats (Mercury, 1959-65 [1965])
Strike Up the Band (Mercury, 1964)
With Yusef Lateef
The Doctor is In... and Out (Atlantic, 1976)
With Michel Legrand
Legrand Jazz (Philips, 1958)
With Mundell Lowe
New Music of Alec Wilder (Riverside, 1956)
Satan in High Heels (soundtrack) (Charlie Parker, 1961)
With Arif Mardin
Journey (Atlantic, 1974)
With Helen Merrill
Casa Forte (Emarcy, 1980)
With the Modern Jazz Quartet
Plastic Dreams (Atlantic, 1971)
With Hugo Montenegro
Arriba! (Time Records, 1960)
With James Moody
Moody with Strings (Argo, 1961)
The Blues and Other Colors (Milestone, 1969)
With David "Fathead" Newman
Scratch My Back (Prestige, 1979)
With Houston Person
Broken Windows, Empty Hallways (Prestige, 1972)
With Lalo Schifrin
Once a Thief and Other Themes (Verve, 1965)
With Don Sebesky
Giant Box (CTI, 1973)
With Sonny Stitt
Mr. Bojangles (Cadet, 1973)
With Gábor Szabó
Mizrab (CTI, 1972)
With Billy Taylor
My Fair Lady Loves Jazz (Impulse!, 1957)
With Stanley Turrentine
The Man with the Sad Face (Fantasy, 1976)
Nightwings (Fantasy, 1977)
With Julius Watkins
French Horns for My Lady (Philips, 1962)
With Randy Weston
Blue Moses (CTI, 1972)
With Phil Woods
Round Trip (Verve, 1969)

References

American jazz horn players
People from Jersey Shore, Pennsylvania
Jazz musicians from Pennsylvania
American session musicians
1922 births
1981 deaths
20th-century American musicians
Eastman School of Music alumni